Jalen Dalton (born August 4, 1997) is an American football defensive end for the Atlanta Falcons of the National Football League (NFL). He also spent time with the New Orleans Saints.

Early life and education
Dalton was born on August 4, 1997, in Clemmons, North Carolina. He attended West Forsyth High School where he was a first-team all-state selection. Rivals.com ranked him the fourth-best defensive end recruit nationally and the best player in the state. After graduating, he announced his commitment to play college football at the University of North Carolina in November 2014.

Among North Carolina's highest recruits, Dalton appeared in nine games as a true freshman, recording 15 tackles. He was considered "lean" for his position at 250 pounds, and increased his weight to 290 for the 2016 season, describing his diet as "eat whatever." As a sophomore that year, he made an appearance in all of the school's 13 games and was a starter in two of them, making a total of 27 tackles, including 1.5 for-loss, a blocked kick, and a fumble recovery.

As a junior in 2017, Dalton started three games and appeared in six additional, finishing the year with 28 tackles, three sacks and 8.0 , the latter of which placed second on the team. Dalton appeared in seven games as a senior, and made 23 tackles, 3.5 sacks and 4.5 TFLs. He finished his college career with 93 total tackles and 6.5 sacks.

Professional career

Chicago Bears
After going unselected in the 2019 NFL Draft, Dalton was signed by the Chicago Bears as an undrafted free agent, following a successful rookie minicamp. He was waived at the final roster cuts, on August 31.

New Orleans Saints
On December 18, 2019, he was signed to the practice squad of the New Orleans Saints. He was signed to a futures contract on January 6, 2020. He suffered a season-ending injury in August 2020.

In 2021, Dalton appeared to be heading towards a final roster spot with the Saints, but suffered another season-ending injury. He was released by New Orleans on May 3, 2022, having not appeared in a single game in his four seasons with the team.

Atlanta Falcons
On June 16, 2022, Dalton was signed by the Atlanta Falcons. He suffered an injury in preseason and was released with an injury settlement shortly afterwards.

On October 18, 2022, Dalton was re-signed to the Falcons' practice squad. He was elevated to the active roster for a week eight game against the Carolina Panthers, and made his NFL debut in the 37–34 win, recording one tackle. He was signed to the active roster on November 5.

References

External links
 Atlanta Falcons bio

1997 births
Living people
People from Forsyth County, North Carolina
American football defensive tackles
Players of American football from North Carolina
North Carolina Tar Heels football players
Chicago Bears players
New Orleans Saints players
Atlanta Falcons players